Lillie Arlene Nicole Jade McCloud (born December 7, 1958 in Rochester, New York), commonly known by her former stage name Nicole McCloud, or  Nicole J. McCloud is an American dance and R&B singer. She has recorded five studio albums, What About Me (1986), Jam Packed (1988) (aka Rock the House), Love Town (1998), So What? (2002), "Red Apples" (2015), . Her single "Don't You Want My Love" became an international hit. Other US singles include "Runnin' Away", "Search'n", "One Good Reason", "Rock the House", and the "Alabaster Box" cover. In the late 1990s, she was also part of a house music project Voices of Freedom.

In 2013, she competed in season 3 of the American singing competition The X Factor. She was eliminated in the 5th week, placing 8th overall.

Career

Solo as Nicole
McCloud first appeared on the Billboard US R&B charts as 'Nicole' in 1985 with "Always and Forever". Her single "Don't You Want My Love" in 1986 reached Top 10 in the US Dance charts, in addition to charting in Belgium, France, Germany, the Netherlands, and Sweden.

Ten of McCloud's singles landed the US Billboard specialized R&B and dance charts. , her biggest hit has been the 1994 single "Runnin’ Away", which peaked at No. 3 on US Dance charts. In 2002 as Nicole J. McCloud, McCloud returned to the Top 10 with "Search’n",  peaking at No. 5 on the US Dance charts. That same year she received a nomination for the International Dance Music Awards, along Craig David and Shakira.

She has recorded hits with Timmy Thomas, U.S.U.R.A. and The Source and has performed with Stevie Wonder, Michael Jackson, the group Kool & The Gang, Bruce Springsteen, Mick Jagger, and other artists.

In Voices of Freedom
In the late 1990s, McCloud joined the American house project Voices of Freedom. The trio also included Angel Williams and Simone Böhlhoff. The trio was featured in a number of recordings, notably in E-Smoove & Ni-Che's 1999 single "Lift Your Hands Up" that featured the vocals of Voices of Freedom. The recording was made available through Finger Printz label. The trio was also featured in a 2002 recording by DJ Pope titled "America at War (Freedom)" on the Yellorange label.

Life in Slovakia
In the mid-2000s, McCloud moved to Košice, a city in Slovakia. Her first Slovak performance took place at the prestigious Košice International Jazz Festival 2006, where she performed with jazz legend Peter Lipa.

In 2010, McCloud provided the title song for Česko Slovensko má talent, the joint Czech/Slovak version of Got Talent series. It was broadcast on TV JOJ in Slovakia and on TV Prima in the Czech Republic.

The X Factor
In 2013, McCloud made a comeback taking part in season 3 of the American singing competition The X Factor identified as Lillie McCloud, her birth name. At the time of applying to The X Factor, she was 54 years old with three children (a son and two daughters) and seven grandchildren.

Her audition was broadcast on September 12, 2013. She received a standing ovation and four "yes" votes from judges Simon Cowell, Demi Lovato, Paulina Rubio and Kelly Rowland for her rendition of CeCe Winans' "Alabaster Box".

She was selected by the judges to progress to the Final 40 and subsequently competed successfully in the Four Chair Challenge, securing her position in the Final 16. As part of the Final Four "Over 25s", she was mentored by Kelly Rowland. She made it as far as the Top 8 but was eliminated on November 28, 2013.

Her performances on The X Factor were:

After X Factor

Red Apples

In 2014, McCloud signed with the Spectra Music Group and released a single entitled "What About The Beautiful Children" and later "The Other Part of Me". Her upcoming album, "Red Apples" is to be released on May 27, 2015 under Monarchy Records, a subsidy of Spectra. On the week ending September 13, 2015, Red Apples debuted at #16 on the UK Soul Charts.

Discography

Albums

Singles

Others
2010: "Got Talent" - theme for Slovak Česko Slovensko má talent
2014: "What About the Beautiful Children"
2014: "The Other Part of Me"

Featured in / Appearances
as Nicole
1994: "I Love Music" / "Don't You Want My Love" / "Conga" (O'Jays / Nicole / Miami Sound Machine)
2011: "Dance" (Guest singer on Takin'Off album Eleven)

as part of Voices of Freedom
1999: "Lift Your Hands Up" (E-Smoove & Ni-Che featuring Voices Of Freedom)
2002: "America at War (Freedom)" (DJ Pope featuring Voices of Freedom)

Videography
2013: "The X Factor USA" (contestant, finished 8th place)
2014: "The Good Life" (herself, performer)

References

External links
 Lillie McCloud on Facebook
 Lillie Nicole McCloud on Soulinterviews.com

1958 births
20th-century African-American women singers
American expatriates in Slovakia
21st-century American singers
20th-century American singers
American contemporary R&B singers
Living people
Musicians from Rochester, New York
The X Factor (American TV series) contestants
20th-century American women singers
21st-century American women singers
21st-century African-American women singers